KDSK (1240 kHz) is a commercial AM radio station, licensed to Los Ranchos de Albuquerque, New Mexico, and serving the Albuquerque metropolitan area radio market. It broadcasts an Oldies radio format with a playlist of approximately 10,000 songs from the 1950s through the 1980s. Hourly news updates from SRN News are featured at the bottom of the hour.

1240 KDSK is simulcast with sister station KDSK-FM 92.7 MHz in Grants, New Mexico.  KDSK is also heard on FM translator station 92.9 K225CH in Rio Rancho.

History

Latin and Children's Formats
The station signed on as KLTN in 1983. On 1988-09-27, the station changed its call sign to KALY.  From 1983 to 2003, it had broadcast Spanish-language programming. In mid-February 2003, the station became a Radio Disney network affiliate, airing a children's radio format.

The Walt Disney Company took then KALY, and five other stations slated to be sold, off the air on January 22, 2010. In late 2010, the Jennifer Smart Foundation purchased the station from Disney for the JENNiRADIO format with station profits being donated to other charities. The station was back on the air with JENNiRADIO format on December 18, 2010.

KDSK
On October 16, 2012, Derek Underhill's KD Radio, Inc. consummated the purchase of KALY at a price of $225,000. The station flipped call letters to KDSK on March 8, 2013.

Through Learfield Sports, New Mexico State University football and basketball were broadcasting on KDSK for the 2015–16 season.

FM Translator
An application to modify a construction permit for a new FM translator station broadcasting on 93.7 as K229CL was filed to give this station an FM signal in Albuquerque. The translator signed on July 12, 2014 at 40 watts from atop Sandia Crest. On March 30, 2015 the translator was upgraded from 40 watts to 250 watts with the antenna pattern directed at the city, greatly improving the signal. On February 16, 2016 KD Radio was granted a construction permit to move translator K297BG (then on 107.3 FM) out of Grants, New Mexico to Rio Rancho while also moving the frequency to 92.9 FM. It was stated on the FCC application that once 92.9 is in operation KDSK will discontinue broadcast on 93.7, which is owned by Telebeeper of New Mexico. On August 29, 2016 KDSK began broadcasting on 92.9. Broadcast on 93.7 ceased in late September and the translator is currently off the air.

References

External links

DSK
Former subsidiaries of The Walt Disney Company